Carla Maria Silva Sousa (born October 26, 1976) is a former Cape Verdean female basketball player.

External links
Profile at fiba.com

References

1976 births
Living people
People from Sal, Cape Verde
Cape Verdean women's basketball players